En Attendant Ana is a French rock group, which was formed in 2014.

History 
Following their debut recording, the six-track Songs from the Cave EP, En Attendant Ana acquired an American distribution via Trouble in Mind.  Their debut album, Lost & Found, was released in April 2018. The follow-up, Juillet, appeared in January 2020.

Members
 Margaux Bouchaudon : vocals, guitar, claviers
 Camille Fréchou : trumpet, guitar, backing vocals
 Adrien Pollin : drums (since 2017)
 Maxence Tomasso : guitar (since 2018)
 Vincent Hivert : bass (since 2020)

Past members:
 Pauline Marin (drums, 2015–2017)
 Romain Meaulard (guitar, 2015–2018)
 Antoine Vaugelade (bass, 2015–2020)

Albums
Studio albums
Lost & Found, 2018 (Montagne Sacrée, Buddy Records and Trouble in Mind)
Juillet, 2020 (Trouble in Mind)

Singles and EPs
Songs from the cave, 2015 (Buddy Records and Montagne Sacrée)

References

French rock music groups
Musical groups established in 2014
2014 establishments in France
Musical groups from Paris